Richard Cottrell (born 15 August 1936) is an English theatre director. He has been the Director of the Cambridge Theatre Company and the Bristol Old Vic in England, and of the Nimrod Theatre in Sydney, Australia. He has also directed for the Royal Shakespeare Company, the Chichester Festival, the Stratford Shakespeare Festival in Stratford, Ontario, the National Theatre of Portugal, and other theatre companies around the world.

Cottrell is also a translator of plays, and an author of a book on art appreciation.

Career
Cottrell was born 15 August 1936, in London. He attended Cambridge University, and trained as an actor in Paris.

Work in Britain

From 1964 to 1966 Cottrell was General Manager of the Hampstead Theatre Club. The first play he directed there was Georges Feydeau's The Birdwatcher, with Michael Bates and Prunella Scales.

From 1966 to 1969, Cottrell was co-founder and Associate Director of the Prospect Theatre Company in Oxford. His work for Prospect included works by Anouilh, Pinter, and Feydeau. His production of Farquhar's The Constant Couple, with Robert Hardy and Timothy West, transferred to the New Theatre in London. Cottrell's own translation of The Cherry Orchard, starring Lila Kedrova and Patrick Wymark, transferred to the Queen's Theatre in London in 1967. Cottrell was instrumental in the career of Ian McKellen, inviting him to star in, and directing him in, his acclaimed Richard II in 1969.

Cottrell translated Georges Feydeau for the Prospect Company, and, with Lance Sieveking, adapted E. M. Forster's Howards End and A Room with a View. With Edward Bond, Cottrell translated Three Sisters for the Royal Court Theatre.

From 1969 to 1975, Cottrell was Director of the newly formed Cambridge Theatre Company. There, in 1970 he directed his own translation of The Seagull, with Lila Kedrova as Madame Arkadina. In 1974 he directed the young Ian Charleson as Hamlet.

From 1975 to 1980, Cottrell was Director of the Bristol Old Vic Company, where his notable productions included The National Health, Hedda Gabler, As You Like It, A Doll's House, and A Midsummer Night's Dream.

Move to Australia

Cottrell became a resident of Australia in 1984. From 1985 to 1987, he was Director of the Nimrod Theatre Company in Sydney. He received a Sydney Critics Award for his first season, in which a permanent company of 16 actors played a season of classical plays in repertoire. His work at Nimrod included The Winter's Tale, Les Liaisons Dangereuses, All's Well That Ends Well, Wild Honey, The Merchant of Venice, and Arms and the Man.

For the Sydney Theatre Company, Cottrell has directed Lettice and Lovage and Vita and Virginia, both starring Ruth Cracknell. For the National Institute of Dramatic Art, he directed his own specially commissioned translation of Racine's Britannicus in 1992. For the Belvoir St Theatre in Sydney, he has directed When the Wind Blows; and for the Marian Street Theatre Company in Sydney he directed Benefactors, Prin, Henceforward..., Neville's Island, and Things We Do for Love.

Cottrell's work in Britain in the 1990s included The Rivals at the Chichester Festival and in the West End; The School for Scandal, Lady Windermere's Fan, also at Chichester; and Three Hours After Marriage for the Royal Shakespeare Company.

Cottrell's recent productions include Ying Tong, A Walk with the Goons, and Travesties for the Sydney Theatre Company. He has directed King Lear for the National Theatre of Portugal in Lisbon, The Uneasy Chair for Playwrights Horizons in New York, and Simone de Beauvoir's The Woman Destroyed at 59E59 in New York.

Cottrell has done opera directing as well. For the Victorian State Opera he directed Andrea Chénier, for which he won a Victorian Green Room Award for Best Opera Production of the Year, and Tannhäuser. For the Opera Theatre of St. Louis he has directed The Merry Widow.

Teaching
Cottrell has taught and directed at the Royal Academy of Dramatic Art in London, the Hong Kong College of the Performing Arts, Boston University, the University of California, the Juilliard School in New York, and all of Australia's leading theatre schools.

Major directing credits
The Birdwatcher, Hampstead Theatre Club, London, 1966
Thieves' Carnival, Prospect Theatre Company, UK cities, 1966
The Constant Couple, Prospect Theatre Company, UK cities, 1967
The Cherry Orchard, Prospect Theatre Company, UK cities, 1967
The Birthday Party, Prospect Theatre Company, UK cities, 1967
Blithe Spirit, Prospect Theatre Company, Lincoln, UK, 1967
The Promise, Prospect Theatre Company, Leicester, UK, 1968
Richard II, Volkstheatre, Vienna, 1969
Staircase, Prospect Theatre Company, UK cities, 1969
Richard II, Prospect Theatre Company, UK cities, 1969
The Alchemist, Cambridge Theatre Company, UK cities, 1970
Semi-Detached, Cambridge Theatre Company, UK cities, 1970
The Seagull, Cambridge Theatre Company, UK cities, 1970
The Recruiting Officer, Cambridge Theatre Company, UK cities, 1970
Chips with Everything, Cambridge Theatre Company, UK cities, 1970
Hay Fever, Cambridge Theatre Company, UK cities, 1971
Three Sisters, Cambridge Theatre Company, UK cities, 1971
Trelawny of the 'Wells', Cambridge Theatre Company, UK cities, 1971
You and Your Clouds, Cambridge Theatre Company, UK cities, 1972
Popkiss, Cambridge Theatre Company, UK cities, 1972
Ruling the Roost, Cambridge Theatre Company, UK cities, 1972
Twelfth Night, Cambridge Theatre Company, UK cities, 1973
Aunt Sally or the Triumph of Death, Cambridge Theatre Company, UK cities, 1973
Jack and the Beanstalk, Cambridge Theatre Company, UK cities, 1973
French Without Tears, Cambridge Theatre Company, UK cities, 1974
Hamlet, Cambridge Theatre Company, UK cities, 1974
Six Characters in Search of an Author, Cambridge Theatre Company, UK cities, 1974
Bloomsbury, Cambridge Theatre, London, 1974
Entertaining Mr Sloane, Cambridge Theatre Company, UK cities, 1975
A Far Better Husband, UK cities, 1975
The National Health, Bristol Old Vic Theatre, Bristol, U.K., 1975
Hard Times, Bristol Old Vic Theatre, Bristol, U.K., 1975
Macbeth, Bristol Old Vic Theatre, 1976
Evening Light, Bristol Old Vic Theatre, 1976
Le Weekend, Bristol Old Vic Theatre, 1976
The Duchess of Malfi, Bristol Old Vic Theatre, 1976
Aladdin, Bristol Old Vic Theatre, 1976
Love's Labour's Lost, Bristol Old Vic Theatre, 1977
Hamlet, Bristol Old Vic Theatre, 1977
Hedda Gabler, Bristol Old Vic Theatre, 1977
She Stoops to Conquer, Manitoba Theatre Centre, Winnipeg, MB, Canada, 1977.
The Provok'd Wife, Bristol Old Vic Theatre, 1978
The Seagull, Bristol Old Vic Theatre, 1978
Cabaret, Bristol Old Vic Theatre, 1978
As You Like It, Bristol Old Vic Theatre, 1978
The Man Who Came to Dinner, Bristol Old Vic Theatre, 1978
Destiny, Bristol Old Vic Theatre, 1979
Troilus and Cressida, Bristol Old Vic Theatre, then Edinburgh Festival, both 1979
A Bee in Her Bonnet, Manitoba Theatre Centre, 1979
Waiting for the Parade, Lyric Hammersmith Theatre, London, 1979.
A Midsummer Night's Dream Bristol Old Vic Theatre, London, 1980
Edward II, Bristol Old Vic Theatre, 1980
Illuminations, Lyric Hammersmith Theatre, 1980
Cyrano de Bergerac, Milwaukee Repertory Theatre, Milwaukee, WI, 1980
Betrayal, UK and European cities, 1981
The Revenger's Tragedy, Adelaide, Australia, 1981
Camino Real, Sydney, Australia, 1982
The Taming of the Shrew, Mid-East cities, 1982
The Taming of the Shrew, Hong Kong Arts Festival, Hong Kong, 1982
All's Well That Ends Well, Stratford Shakespeare Festival, Stratford, ON, Canada, 1982.
Uncle Vanya, Milwaukee Repertory Theatre, 1983
Richard II, Stratford Shakespearean Festival, 1983
The Country Wife, Stratford Shakespearean Festival, 1983
A Doll's House, Bristol Old Vic Theatre, 1984
Widowers' Houses, RADA, London, 1988
Don's Party, Australia, 1984
Pack of Lies, Brisbane, Australia, 1985
When the Wind Blows, Sydney, 1985
Arms and the Man, Nimrod Theatre Company, Sydney, 1985
Benefactors, Nimrod Theatre Company, Sydney, 1986
Wild Honey, Nimrod Theatre Company, Sydney, 1986
The Merchant of Venice, Nimrod Theatre Company, Sydney, 1986
All's Well That Ends Well, Nimrod Theatre Company, Sydney, 1986
The Winter's Tale Nimrod Theatre Company, Sydney, 1987
Les Liaisons dangereuses, Nimrod Theatre Company, Sydney, 1987
Andrea Chénier, Victorian State Opera, Melbourne, Australia, 1988
Strike Up the Banns, Theatre Clywdd, Wales, 1988
The Rivals, Chichester Festival Theatre, 1994
The School for Scandal, Chichester Festival Theatre, 1995; Theatre Royal, Bath, 1996
Three Hours After Marriage, Royal Shakespeare Company, Swan Theatre, Stratford-upon-Avon, and Barbican Theatre Centre, London, 1996
Lady Windermere's Fan, Chichester Festival Theatre, 1997
Vita and Virginia, Sydney Theatre Company, 1997–1998
King Lear, National Theatre of Portugal, Lisbon, 1997
Bloody Funny, Lookout Theatre, Sydney, 1998
The Uneasy Chair, Playwrights Horizons, New York, 1998
Things We Do for Love, Marian Street Theatre, Sydney, 1999
She Stoops to Conquer, Sydney Theatre Company, 2000
Indian Ink, Canadian Stage Company, Toronto, 2002
The Woman Destroyed, 59E59 Theater, New York, 2004
Ying Tong, A Walk With the Goons, Sydney Theatre Company and Australian cities, 2007–2008
Travesties, Sydney Theatre Company, 2009
Loot, Sydney Theatre Company, 2011

Bibliography
Cottrell, Richard. Looking at Paintings: A Private View. Murdoch Books, 2009.

References
1969 Bio on McKellen.com
Richard Cottrell at International Casting Associates

Notes

External links
Richard Cottrell – Official Site
Richard Cottrell at Theatricalia.com

Bio on McKellen.com

English theatre directors
British theatre directors
1936 births
Living people